The Duke of York is a public house at Leysters, Leominster, Herefordshire HR6 0HW.

It is on the Campaign for Real Ale's National Inventory of Historic Pub Interiors.

It has been run by the same family since 1911.

References

National Inventory Pubs
Pubs in Herefordshire